Tomlinson Hall was a public meeting hall in Indianapolis, Indiana, on the northeast corner of Market and Delaware streets adjacent to the Indianapolis City Market. It hosted a variety of public events from 1886 until January 30, 1958, when it was destroyed in a fire.

The building was named for Stephen D. Tomlinson, an Indianapolis druggist, whose will had bequeathed the money to build it.

Beginnings 
The will of Indianapolis druggist Stephen D. Tomlinson, who had died on November 14, 1870, provided that the residue of his estate would, upon the death of his wife, Mary Todd Brown Tomlinson, be given to city of Indianapolis to construct a "public building" on the western portion of what was then East Market Square, a farmer's market that had operated since the 1830s.

The city reached an agreement with Mrs. Tomlinson in 1874 to receive the estate immediately. However, construction was delayed while the question of whether the site, which the State of Indiana had given to the city for use as a public market, could be used for other purposes. Some of the city's leaders also feared that the erection of a public hall would ultimately require a tax increase. The city council decided that the new structure would house both the public hall and the city market.

The city organized a design contest that was won by local architect Diedrich A. Bohlen. Construction using Bohlen's designs, began in 1883, and extended more than two years at a cost of $125,000. The first floor housed offices and overflow from the City Market, while the second floor contained a large auditorium with a seating capacity of 4,200 people in the audience and an additional 650 people on the stage.

Opening and events 

Tomlinson Hall was inaugurated on June 2, 1886, as a part of the Grand Army of the Republic Music Festival that raised money for the construction of the Soldiers' and Sailors' Monument. William Tecumseh Sherman was one of the dignitaries presiding over that event.

On June 27, 1888, the hall was the site of a large celebration honoring the nomination of Benjamin Harrison for president of the United States. Rallies were held in 1917 to mark the declaration of war on Germany in World War I and in 1920 to mark the city's centennial.

The hall was host to several kinds of public activities during its history, including concerts, fund raisers, political events, conventions, and sporting events. Notable entertainers who performed there included John Philip Sousa and his band (which featured soprano Estelle Liebling), pianist Ignacy Jan Paderewski, silent movie star Rudolph Valentino, and many prominent big bands of the 1920s. The hall was also host to the city's annual May Music Festival. During the Great Depression of the 1930s, dance marathons were held in the hall.

Deterioration and fire 

Beginning in the 1930s, Tomlinson Hall began to deteriorate, leading city leaders in the 1950s to consider what should be done with it. A persistent proposal was to demolish it and build a parking garage on the site. In 1955, the National Board of Fire Underwriters called the structure the "city's worst fire hazard".

The hall was destroyed by fire on January 30, 1958, allegedly after a pigeon dropped a lit cigarette on the roof of the building. The city issued a contract to demolish the building, but a group of citizens who wanted to maintain the civic landmark obtained a restraining order on March 10. The judge subsequently vacated the order on May 13, finding that because Tomlinson Hall was not part of the original market trust, the city was within its rights to raze it. The demolition was completed in July.

The demolition dealt only with the aboveground portions of the structure. The basement had been used to transport and store goods in a cooler location for the market vendors on the first floor. Subsequent construction of a new west wing of the City Market in the 1970s retained the basement. Since then the  underground area, while no longer used for any purpose, has become known as the Indianapolis Catacombs, with guided tours given at various times.

When the adjacent City Market was rehabilitated in the 1970s, an arch from Tomlinson Hall that had been incorporated into a later wall was uncovered and renovated as a memorial to the hall and its benefactor.

References

Buildings and structures in Indianapolis
Buildings and structures completed in 1886
Buildings and structures demolished in 1958
Theatres in Indiana
Tourist attractions in Indianapolis
Sports venues in Indianapolis
Burned buildings and structures in the United States